Emma Godwin (born 24 April 1997) is a New Zealand swimmer. She competed in the women's 200 metre backstroke event at the 2018 FINA World Swimming Championships (25 m), in Hangzhou, China.

References

1997 births
Living people
New Zealand female swimmers
Female backstroke swimmers
Place of birth missing (living people)
21st-century New Zealand women